Rosemont–La Petite-Patrie is a borough (arrondissement) in the city of Montreal, Quebec, Canada. It is located in the centre-east of the city.

Geography

The borough is bordered to the northwest by Villeray–Saint-Michel–Parc-Extension, to the northeast by Saint Leonard, to the southeast by Mercier—Hochelaga-Maisonneuve, to the southwest by Le Plateau-Mont-Royal and its Mile End neighbourhood, and to the west by Outremont.

It has a population of 139,950 and an area of 15.9 km².

Government

Municipal

As of the November 7, 2021 Montreal municipal election, the current borough council consists of the following councillors:

Federal and provincial
The borough is divided among the following federal ridings:

Rosemont—La Petite-Patrie, Alexandre Boulerice, M.P. NDP
Hochelaga, Soraya Martinez Ferrada, M.P. Liberal Party of Canada
Outremont, Rachel Bendayan, M.P. Liberal Party of Canada

It is divided among the following provincial electoral districts:

Gouin, Gabriel Nadeau-Dubois, QS
Rosemont, Vincent Marissal, QS
Hochelaga-Maisonneuve, Alexandre Leduc, QS

Demographics

Features

The northwestern area of the borough is served by the orange and blue lines of the Montreal Metro. Major thoroughfares include Beaubien St., Rosemont Blvd., Masson St., Saint Laurent Blvd., Saint Hubert St., Papineau Ave., Pie-IX Blvd., and Viau St. The notorious Tunnel de la mort is located in that borough, at the intersection of Iberville St. and Saint-Joseph Blvd.

The borough includes the neighbourhoods of the Petite Patrie, comprising several "ethnic" neighbourhoods such as Little Italy; Rosemont; and Nouveau Rosemont.

Important features of the borough include the Jean-Talon Market, the Montreal Heart Institute, the Hôpital Santa Cabrini, the Hôpital Maisonneuve-Rosemont, the Olympic Village, Maisonneuve Park (including the Insectarium and Montreal Botanical Garden), Saint Sophie Ukrainian Orthodox Cathedral, the Church of the Madonna della Difesa and Dante Park.

The Montreal Public Libraries Network operates the Rosemont, Marc-Favreau and La Petite-Patrie libraries.

Education
The Commission scolaire de Montréal (CSDM) operates French-language public schools.

The English Montreal School Board (EMSB) operates English-language schools.

Elementary 
 Nesbitt Elementary School
 Pierre Elliott Trudeau Elementary School

High school 
 Rosemount High School
 Vincent Massey Collegiate

Specialized 
 Rosemount Technology Centre

See also
 Boroughs of Montreal
 Districts of Montreal
 List of hospitals in Montreal
 Municipal reorganization in Quebec
 Saint-Esprit-de-Rosemont Church

References

External links

Borough website (in French)

 
Boroughs of Montreal